Jindřich Svoboda may refer to:

 Jindřich Svoboda (footballer) (born 1952), Czech footballer
 Jindřich Svoboda (aviator) (1917–1942), Czech aviator